"Kara" is the series finale of the American TV series Supergirl, based on the DC Comics character Kara Zor-El / Supergirl. It is set in the Arrowverse, sharing continuity with the other television series of the universe. The twentieth episode of the sixth season, it was written by Rob Wright & Derek Simon from a story by showrunners Robert Rovner & Jessica Queller, and directed by Jesse Warn.

Melissa Benoist stars as Kara, and is joined by principal cast members Chyler Leigh, Katie McGrath, Jesse Rath, Nicole Maines, Azie Tesfai, Julie Gonzalo, Peta Sergeant and David Harewood. The episode sees Kara being aided by several old allies in her fight against Nyxly and Lex Luthor. Several former series regulars make guest appearances, including Mehcad Brooks, Chris Wood, Jeremy Jordan, and Calista Flockhart.

"Kara" premiered in the United States on The CW on November 9, 2021, and was watched by 0.49 million viewers with a 0.2 share among adults aged 18 to 49.

Plot 

After being mortally wounded, Lillian Luthor tells Lena to fully own her power and dies. Kara Danvers / Supergirl reassures the people of humanity and they reclaim their power, weakening Lex Luthor and Nyxly. The Superfriends, joined by Acrata, Orlando Davis, Mitch, Eliza Danvers, Mon-El, Winn Schott, and Jimmy Olsen, fight Lex, Nyxly, and manifestations of Overgirl, Red Tornado, Metallo, Parasite, the Hell Dragon, and the Nightmare Monster. Lex opens a portal to the Phantom Zone. Since they feed on fear and their supposed victims stand strong, the Phantoms drag Lex and Nyxly in. Days later, the Superfriends attend William Dey's funeral and reestablish the DEO. Mon-El tells Kara that he will no longer be able to return to the past to see her, due to his responsibility with The Legion. Three weeks later, Cat Grant re-buys CatCo and offers Kara a job as her editor-in-chief. Alex Danvers and Kelly Olsen get married, and Brainy decides to stay in the present with Nia. Winn hints that J'onn and M'gann have a son in the future. Cat and Lena convince Kara to accept the job and end her double life by revealing her identity as Supergirl to the world so she can live a more full life as one person.

Production

Development 
In late October 2021, it was announced that the series finale of the American TV series Supergirl would be titled "Kara". The episode, which is the twentieth episode of the sixth season, was directed by Jesse Warn, and written by Rob Wright & Derek Simon from a story by showrunners Robert Rovner & Jessica Queller.

Casting and filming 
Main cast members Melissa Benoist, Chyler Leigh, Katie McGrath, Jesse Rath, Nicole Maines, Azie Tesfai, Julie Gonzalo, Peta Sergeant and David Harewood appear as Kara Danvers / Supergirl, Alex Danvers / Sentinel, Lena Luthor, Querl Dox / Brainiac 5, Nia Nal, Kelly Olsen, Andrea Rojas / Acrata, Nyxly and J'onn J'onzz / Martian Manhunter. Former regulars Mehcad Brooks, Chris Wood, Jeremy Jordan and Calista Flockhart guest star as Jimmy Olsen, Mon-El, Winn Schott and Cat Grant. Benoist said it "would not have felt right" if Brooks, Wood and Jordan did not return. The additional guest cast includes Jon Cryer as Lex Luthor, Brenda Strong as Lillian Luthor, Helen Slater as Eliza Danvers, Matt Baram as Mitch, Mila Jones as Esme, Jhaleil Swaby as Orlando Davis and Crystal Balint as Secretary Brown. Filming on the episode began in late July 2021, and ended in early August. As per the original filming schedule, Benoist would be the last actor to shoot, but she, Leigh and Harewood pushed for rearrangement so that all three of them would together finish the final filming day.

Reception

Ratings 
"Kara" premiered in the United States on The CW on November 9, 2021. It was watched by 0.49 million viewers with a 0.2 share among adults aged 18 to 49.

Critical response 
Amelia Emberwing of IGN gave the episode a rating of 9 out of 10, saying despite the lack of action, "it ends on the exact note it was always meant to. It [leans] into every aspect that show's detractors ever called it weak for, and it's all the stronger because of it". Caroline Siede of The A.V. Club gave the episode a B rating, saying it "stumbles through some messy plotting before delivering a pitch-perfect farewell". Michael Patterson of Bam Smack Pow gave the episode an A rating, saying, "Supergirl bows out on a heartfelt note, revisiting its past to move into the future (and bringing back a few familiar faces in the process), and it all ensures that Kara Danvers’ moving story ends on the highest of highs".

References

External links 
 

2021 American television episodes
American LGBT-related television episodes
American television series finales
Supergirl (TV series) episodes
Television episodes about same-sex weddings